Noddy, Toyland Detective (French: Oui-Oui, Enquêtes au Pays des Jouets) is a computer animated series featuring the character Noddy created by Enid Blyton. The series was produced by DreamWorks Animation Television and Gaumont Animation. Commissioned by France Télévisions, it premiered on March 26, 2016, on the platform Zouzous, and aired on France 5, on April 2, 2016.

Cast and characters

Main 
 Noddy (voiced by Louis Ashbourne Serkis in Series 1 and Santiago Winder in series 2 in the British English version, Valin Shinyei and Antonio Mattera in the  American English version, and Brigitte Lecordier in the French version) – Noddy is an investigator in Toyland. Whenever Noddy finds a mystery difficult to solve, and says “This investigation  is really hard”, Bumpy, Big Ears, or Revs usually encourages him, and he always goes back to what Big Ears/ Mr. Squeaks always says, “A good investigator looks and looks again”, “thinks and thinks again”, or “investigates and investigates again”.
Whenever he knows that he’s solved the case, the bell on his blue hat rings, and he says “Ring a Ding”.
He also uses his pad to help him solve cases to compare what he has taken photos of and asks, “who wears…”?, or “who has…?”
 Bumpy the Dog – Noddy's dog and trusty sidekick. He licks Noddy’s face, whenever he says,this investigation’s really hard, and afterwards thanks Bumpy and then quotes Big Ears.
 Big Ears (voiced by Jonathan Kydd) – Noddy's neighbour and mentor. He is a squeaky toy brownie. He is known as Mr. Squeaks in the North American dub. Prior to Noddy starting his investigation, Big Ears always asks him, “How are you going to solve this one Noddy”?, of “what are you going to do today Noddy?”
Whenever Noddy solves a case, he says to him, “Well done Noddy, you’ve solved the investigation, how did you do it? Noddy then does a trick by twirling his pad on his finger, and says, “Thanks”, and explains how he did it.
 Revs – Noddy's red and yellow car which is alive and communicates by using the horn. He can also transform into a helicopter.

Supporting 
 Pat-Pat (voiced by Martha Howe-Douglas) – Following on from the classic character of Tessie Bear, Pat-Pat is one of Noddy's closest friends. She's a creative, kind and friendly Panda plush toy who wears a pink dress. She has three smaller panda friends called the Pockets. The Pockets are extremely high-energy and excitable. When running they transform into black and white tennis balls.
 Deltoid (voiced by Bob Golding) – Deltoid is a male, futuristic toy superhero with a white sleeveless shirt, and tall, blonde hair. He is the strongest toy in all of Toyland, and aspires to be brave and noble, but is sometimes afraid and naive. He may have a crush on Smartysaurus. He usually makes statements like; “I, deltoid…” or “ha ha ha ha”, when showing off his athletic skills.
 Smartysaurus (voiced by Jess Robinson)– A female, blue toy dinosaur who wears a white lab coat and clear goggles. She is a super smart scientist. She often adds "-saurus" or "-asarus" to the ends of words like when she describes herself as a "clumsy-saurus" or says "point-asaurus" when remembering how to perform a dance move. She also usually wears purple sunglasses.
 Fuse (voiced by Jonathan Kydd) – A male, white, modern toy robot, with a blue coloured screen that shows his face. He can change his face by saying the way he feels, and the face that goes with the feeling he has said (like Baby from Kuu Kuu Harajuku) He is emotional, but gleeful.
Farmer Tom – A friendly farmer and near neighbor to Pat-Pat.
Tractor – Farmer Tom's tractor who communicates by using his horn.
Clockwork Mouse – A female wind-up mouse who dresses in a yellow blouse with daisies, who is the mayor of Brickabuild. She is loosely based on the character from the classic Noddy series.
Carlton – A male, wheeled cat toy who dresses in a yellow suit jacket with green pants, and is Clockwork Mouse's assistant and chauffeur.
Queen Sparklewings – The queen of Fable Forest. She has brown hair in a bun, and a long, sparkly white dress
Coco and Cleo – Two fairies in Fable Forest, who are also best friends.
Pirates – Four pirates and their parrot Scurvy who live in Pirate Cove, Captain, First Mate Pirate Stripes, and two unnamed pirates.
Ninjas – Four ninjas who live in Daredale, wearing blue, green, pink, and red.
The Knights – Five Knights in Fable Forest.
The Naughticorns – Three unicorns who live in the patchwork blanket.
Hoof – An indigo, male Unicorn with straight, dark blue hair. He is emotional and silly, he often plays pranks on others, and sometimes it hurts their feelings. But inside, he has a good heart, and always apologizes when he does something wrong.
Bling – A pink, female Unicorn with curly, dark pink hair. She is very vain, and looks at her appearance often. She also thinks of herself a lot, and She sometimes makes remarks that aren't nice. But she makes up for them later, and tries to be a good friend to others.
Cloppycorn – A White, male unicorn with shaggy, light blue green hair. He is smaller than the other two, and is shy. Hoof and Bling often make him do things they don't want to do first. He always tries to get attention from them, but they sometimes forget about him. But they truly do like him, and try their best to be nice to him.
The Builders – Construction workers in Brickabuild.
Train-An emotional, prone to worry train that blows bubbles.
Driver Dylan-Train’s Driver

Development 
The series was produced by Gaumont Animation and DreamWorks Animation Television, with the participation of France Télévisions and Piwi+. The show was developed by Heath Kenny, Diane Morel and Myles McLeod.

Episodes

Series overview

Series 1

Season 2 (2018-2020)

Specials

Broadcast
In France, the series premiered on March 26, 2016, on the France Télévisions's platform Zouzous, and it aired on April 2, 2016, on France 5. In the United Kingdom, the series premiered on April 18, 2016, on the Channel 5's block Milkshake!. In the United States, the series airs on Universal Kids and is also available on Netflix  In Australia, the series airs on ABC Kids. In Brazil, the series airs on Gloobinho. In Spain, the series airs on Clan, tvG2, Super3, ETB 3 and À Punt. In Portugal, it airs on Canal Panda.

The series is also available for streaming on iTunes, Hulu, DreamWorks GO and YouTube.

References

External links 
 

2016 French television series debuts
2020 French television series endings
2010s French animated television series
2020s French animated television series
2016 American television series debuts
2020 American television series endings
2010s American animated television series
2020s American animated television series
2016 British television series debuts
2020 British television series endings
2010s British animated television series
2020s British animated television series
2010s preschool education television series
2020s preschool education television series
American children's animated fantasy television series
American children's animated mystery television series
American computer-animated television series
American detective television series
American preschool education television series
Animated preschool education television series
British children's animated fantasy television series
British children's animated mystery television series
British computer-animated television series
British detective television series
British preschool education television series
English-language television shows
French children's animated fantasy television series
French children's animated mystery television series
French computer-animated television series
French-language television shows
French preschool education television series
Adaptations of works by Enid Blyton
Television series by DreamWorks Animation
Television series by Universal Television
Universal Kids original programming
Gaumont Animation